TGW may refer to:

 Scoot, Singaporean low-cost airline (ICAO airport code)
 TGW Logistics Group
 Transit Gateway in AWS VPC